Première Classe is a 1984 short film directed by Mehdi El Glaoui. It received the César Award for Best Short Film at the 10th César Awards.

Synopsis 
The short romantic comedy follows the encounter of a man and a woman in a train compartment.

Cast 

 André Dussollier
 Francis Huster
 Pierre Charras
 Beth Todd

References 

1984 films
1984 short films
French short films
César Award winners